The Bavarian card game of Schafkopf has such a plethora of special words, terms and phrases that it is described as a Schafkopf language which is often  unintelligible to outsiders. The language ranges from associative terms to coarse language. Grumbling, bleating and schimpfing are part of the game of Schafkopf and are, so to speak, the "salt in the soup". Here are examples of some of the more common words, names and phrases.

Note: the expressions listed here are mainly those used in the Old Bavarian dialect, although the most common terms are used throughout Bavaria and thus also found in the Franconian, Swabian and Hessian (Aschaffenburg, Odenwald) dialects. Regional terms are designated as such. Note that some idioms cannot be precisely translated or may lose their poetry or impact in English. Where no translation is offered, the original is used.

Card names

Nicknames given to the Obers and Unters

Nicknames for the Aces / Sows

Other card nicknames

Contracts 
Various words and phrases are used to describe or announce the different Schafkopf contracts:

Special terms

Some "official" terms

Various

References

Literature 
 
 

Card game terminology
Schafkopf group
Culture of Altbayern
Bavarian language
Glossaries of card games
Wikipedia glossaries using tables